Comet, in comics, may refer to:

 Comet (Archie Comics), an Archie Comics character
 Comet (DC Comics), a number of DC Comics characters
 Comet (Impact Comics), an Impact Comics character
 Comet (Marvel Comics), a Marvel Comics character
 The Comet (comic magazine), a British publication

See also
 Comet (disambiguation)
 Captain Comet

References